St. Mark's Square can refer to:
 Piazza San Marco, the central square of Venice, Italy
 Piazza San Marco, Florence, a square in Florence, Italy
 St. Mark's Square, Zagreb, a major square in Zagreb, Croatia
 St. Mark's Square in the south of Lincoln, England

See also
 St. Mark's (disambiguation)